Deerhorn is an unincorporated community in Lane County, Oregon, United States.

Deerhorn had a post office from 1907 to 1913. The office was originally at Leaburg. In 1915, Deerhorn had a population of 75 and both elementary and high schools.

References

External links
Images of the Deerhorn area from Flickr

Unincorporated communities in Lane County, Oregon
1907 establishments in Oregon
Populated places established in 1907
Unincorporated communities in Oregon